Zuo Quan (15 March 1905 – 2 June 1942), also named Zuo Shuren, born in Liling, Hunan, was a general in the Chinese Red Army during the Chinese revolution and the war against Japan, and a senior staff officer of the Eighth Route Army.  He died in combat in 1942.

Zuo graduated in the first class of Whampoa Military Academy, joined the Chinese Communist Party (CCP) in 1925, and helped to found a secret organization amongst Whampoa's pro-communist students, the Huoxingshe, and later another called Young Soldiers United (Qingnian Junren Lianhehui).  Zuo was appointed a company commander in the Nationalist Army after graduation.  After the CCP's split with the Kuomintang, Zuo travelled to Moscow where he studied at Sun Yatsen University and then the Soviet Military Academy, graduating in 1930. Zuo travelled back to China, arriving in Shanghai with Liu Bocheng, and was sent to the Soviet area in Jiangxi.  Zuo became an instructor and then commandant of the First Branch, Red Army Military Academy, and later assumed command of the New 12th Army.  After 1933 Zuo was appointed the First Army Group Chief of Staff, and participated in the Long March.  When the Anti Japanese War began in 1937, Zuo became the Deputy Chief of Staff, Eighth Route Army, and was a key organizer in 1938-39 of the highly successful rear area behind Japanese lines upon which the Eighth Route Army's reputation was built.  From August to December 1940, Zuo participated in the leadership of the Hundred Regiments Campaign.  In 1941, when the Social Affairs Department (Shehuibu) sent an intelligence detachment to the Eighth Route Army to support it, that group was at first sponsored by Zuo Quan who subordinated it to his own staff within a year and subsequently controlled its tasking, personnel, and operations.  While under Zuo the detachment successfully established intelligence stations behind enemy lines throughout the Taihang-Shandong area, and set up an agent network in Peiping.  In May–June 1942 Zuo engaged in battles to cover the retreat of the Eighth Route Army, and was fatally wounded by a Japanese artillery shell on 2 June 1942 while leading a breakout. After his death the CCP renamed Liao County in Shanxi Province Zuoquan County, in his honor.

References

Military personnel of the Republic of China killed in the Second Sino-Japanese War
Chinese Communist Party politicians from Hunan
1905 births
1942 deaths
National Revolutionary Army generals from Hunan
Frunze Military Academy alumni
Politicians from Zhuzhou
Republic of China politicians from Hunan
Chinese expatriates in the Soviet Union
Moscow Sun Yat-sen University alumni